Crabapple, Texas is an unincorporated farming and ranching community  north of Fredericksburg in Gillespie County, Texas located on Crabapple Creek, about halfway between Fredericksburg and Enchanted Rock State Park  at an elevation of 1,775 feet.
 The school was designated a Recorded Texas Historic Landmark number 10022 in 1994. The school was added to the National Register of Historic Places in Texas on May 6, 2005, NRHP Reference #:05000390.

Settlers and community
The initial non-indigenous settlers in Crabapple were German immigrants Friedrich Welgehausen, Jacob Land, Adam Pehl, Mathias Schmidt, Nicolaus Rusche, James Riley, Heinrich Kneese, and Jacob and Adam Fries
 in the mid 19th Century.

On December 15, 1847, a petition was submitted to create Gillespie County. In 1848, the legislature formed Gillespie County from Bexar and Travis counties. While the signers were overwhelmingly German immigrants, names also on the petition were Castillo, Pena, Munos,  and a handful of non-German Anglo names.

Crabapple School and post office

The original schoolhouse also served as a post office from 1887–1910.

Balanced Rock
Balanced Rock

  was a famous local landmark that perched atop Bear Mountain in the Crabapple Community.   The natural stone pillar, about the size of a small elephant, precariously balanced on its small tip.  It fell prey to vandals who dynamited it off its base in April 1986.

See also
 Cherry Spring
 Cherry Springs Dance Hall
 Doss
 Enchanted Rock
 Fredericksburg
 Loyal Valley
 Sisterdale
 Texas Hill Country
 Willow City

Climate
The climate in this area is characterized by hot, humid summers and generally mild to cool winters.  According to the Köppen Climate Classification system, Crabapple has a humid subtropical climate, abbreviated "Cfa" on climate maps.

References

External links

Friends of Gillespie County Country Schools
Gillespie County Historical Society

 

Unincorporated communities in Texas
Unincorporated communities in Gillespie County, Texas
German-American history
German-American culture in Texas